Myron B. Thompson Academy, commonly referred to as Thompson Academy or MBTA, is an e-learning institution operating as a "New Century Public Charter School" under the Hawaii Department of Education. Thompson Academy is the result of a white paper study developed by the school's principal, Diana Oshiro, detailing the feasibility of a school delivered over the internet. Established in 1999 as Hawaii e-Charter, Thompson Academy is available to students across the state of Hawaii exclusively through the internet, as an alternative-of-choice to local schools. The school is currently accredited by the Western Association of Schools and Colleges.

Early beginnings
The concept for Thompson Academy predates the inception of Hawaii's  E-School system. In 1994, state Assistant Superintendent Diana Oshiro began writing a white paper discussing the use of the internet as a medium to deliver courses. This white paper later went on to win a five-year grant from the US Department of Education and became what is now known as the Hawaii E-School system, the collaboration between the Hawaii Department of Education and US Department of Education to create, test and provide supplemental courses over the internet.

Five years later, as the federal grant was concluding, those responsible for E-Schools began investigating the viability and sustainability of a virtual charter school, based on lessons learned from the project. From this investigation, the a charter school started developing with a statewide Hawaii e-Charter being brought to fruition in 1999 and granted a charter by the Hawaii Department of Education in 2000.

In 2002 Hawaii e-Charter renamed itself Myron B. Thompson Academy, paying homage to Hawaii educator and former trustee of Kamehameha Schools, Myron "Pinky" B. Thompson. In that same year, the school began offering elementary education, for students entering kindergarten through grade six.

Thompson's rise in Hawaii

K–12 education
Thompson Academy provides two  schools of education, a home school based elementary program and an online secondary program (high school).

Elementary education
Thompson Academy's K–6 division is a supported home school program. Families are provided a stipend for educational supplies and curriculum, and are provided guidance in the education of their children.

Secondary education
Students in grades 7–12 are enrolled in the school's online, secondary education program. With course-content available exclusively over the internet, students progress their studies with a school provided laptop computer. Teachers located at the school's principal operating base of Honolulu administer courses, provide content guidance and other assistance to students, and track their continual progress in courses. The vast majority of students enrolled in the school are in this program.

Campuses
Although Thompson Academy is principally located in Honolulu (Oahu), the school has several satellite campuses where students can receive additional help and tutoring from site teachers and socialize with other students. Satellite campuses are located on the neighboring islands of Maui, the Big Island and Kauai.

Extracurricular activities
Thompson Academy provides a small number of extracurricular student activities, including:

 Student Government
 Athletics, including Basketball

Notable students
 Bethany Hamilton, female professional surfer and shark attack survivor

References

Hawaii Department of Education, Accreditation (accessed March 21, 2006)
 Honolulu Advertiser, "Charter school popularity up" (accessed March 21, 2006)
 Honolulu Advertiser, "E-school learning hoops the hard way" (accessed March 21, 2006)

External links
 Myron B. Thompson Academy
 Hawaii Department of Education

Educational institutions established in 1999
Public K-12 schools in Hawaii
Charter schools in Hawaii
1999 establishments in Hawaii